Smilde is a town in the Netherlands' northern province of Drenthe and lies about  southwest of the province capital of Assen. Smilde was a separate municipality until 1998, when it became a part of Middenveld. However, that name changed in 2000 and was renamed the municipality of Midden-Drenthe.

History 
The village was first mentioned in 1846 as Smilde. The etymology is unclear. Smilde is a elongated canal village which developed around 1770. The first settlement was called Kloosterveen and was later renamed to Smilde.

The Dutch Reformed church was built between 1780 and 1788 in Louis XVI style. It was restored in 1963. The former town hall was originally built as a villa in Renaissance Revival style and was named Villa Maria. In 1931, it became town hall.

Smilde was home to 1,675 people in 1840. Smilde was an independent municipality until 1998 when it was merged into Midden-Drenth.

People from Smilde 
 Carry van Bruggen-de Haan (1881–1932), writer
 Jacob Israël de Haan (1881–1924), anti-Zionist and ultra-Orthodox activist
 Hendrikje van Andel-Schipper (1890–2005), oldest person from the Netherlands, aged 115 at the time of her death
 Alwin Kloekhorst (b. 1978), Indo-Europeanist and Hittitologist at the University of Leiden

Gallery

References 

Municipalities of the Netherlands disestablished in 1998
Former municipalities of Drenthe
Populated places in Drenthe
Midden-Drenthe